Ripple is a real-time gross settlement system, currency exchange and remittance network created by Ripple Labs Inc., a US-based technology company. Released in 2012, Ripple is built upon a distributed open source protocol, and supports tokens representing fiat currency, cryptocurrency, commodities, or other units of value such as frequent flier miles or mobile minutes.  Ripple purports to enable "secure, instantly and nearly free global financial transactions of any size with no chargebacks". The ledger employs the native cryptocurrency known as XRP.

In December 2020, Ripple Labs and two of its executives were sued by the U.S. Securities and Exchange Commission (SEC) for selling XRP tokens, which the SEC classified as unregistered securities.

History 
Ripple was conceived by Jed McCaleb and built by Arthur Britto and David Schwartz who then approached Ryan Fugger who had debuted  in 2005 as a financial service to provide secure payment options to members of an online community via a global network. Fugger had developed a system called OpenCoin which would transform into Ripple. The company also created its own form of digital currency referred to as XRP to allow financial institutions to transfer money with negligible fees and wait-time. In 2013, the company reported interest from banks for using its payment system. 

By 2018, over 100 banks had signed up, but most of them were only using Ripple's XCurrent messaging technology, while avoiding the XRP cryptocurrency due to its volatility problems. Representatives of the Society for Worldwide Interbank Financial Telecommunication (SWIFT), whose market dominance is being challenged by Ripple, have argued that the scalability issues of Ripple and other blockchain solutions remain unsolved, confining them to bilateral and intra-bank applications. A Ripple executive acknowledged in 2018 that "We started out with your classic blockchain, which we love. But the feedback from the banks is you can’t put the whole world on a blockchain."

Ripple relies on a common shared ledger, which is a distributed database storing information about all Ripple accounts. Chris Larsen told the Stanford Graduate School of Business that the network was managed by a network of independent servers which compare their transaction records, and that servers could in theory belong to anyone, including banks or market makers. Ripple validates accounts and balances instantly for payment transmission and delivers payment notification within a few seconds. Payments are irreversible, and there are no chargebacks.

Ripple Labs continued as the primary contributors of code to the consensus verification system behind Ripple. In 2014, the protocol gained access to the US banking system amid concerns over security and a lack of regulation.

Litigation

A class action was filed against Ripple in May 2018 "alleging that it led a scheme to raise hundreds of millions of dollars through unregistered sales of its XRP tokens". According to the complaint, "the company created billions of coins 'out of thin air' and then profited by selling them to the public in 'what is essentially a never-ending initial coin offering.

The U.S. Securities and Exchange Commission (SEC) initiated legal proceedings against Ripple Labs, CEO Brad Garlinghouse, and co-founder Chris Larsen on December 21, 2020, for allegedly selling unregistered securities. In the lawsuit, the SEC claimed that XRP was a security instead of a commodity, because it was generated and distributed by Ripple Labs in a centralized fashion and was not being adopted by financial institutions for its advertised use cases. The SEC stated that Ripple executives sold 14.6 billion units of XRP for more than $1.38 billion to fund the company's operations and enrich themselves. 

In response, Garlinghouse criticized the SEC and indicated that Ripple Labs would defend itself in court. Coinbase delisted XRP on December 28; an investor filed a class action on December 30 alleging that Coinbase sold XRP tokens with the understanding that they were unregistered securities.

On April 13, 2021, SEC Commissioner Hester M. Peirce published the Token Safe Harbor Proposal 2.0, which is ″intended to provide Initial Development Teams with a three-year time period within which they can facilitate participation in, and the continued development of, a functional or decentralized network, exempt from the registration provisions of the federal securities laws so long as certain conditions are met.″

Reception
For its creation and development of the Ripple protocol (RTXP) and the Ripple payment/exchange network Ripple Labs was named as one of 2014's 50 Smartest Companies in the February 2014 edition of MIT Technology Review. A scientific study made by two researchers from Stanford and Stockholm universities that studied the money production from an energy consumption point of view and a macroeconomic level stated that running a server on Ripple was comparable to the energy needs of running an email server.

See also

 Diem (digital currency)
 List of online payment service providers
 List of cryptocurrencies
 Mojaloop

References

External links
 

Private currencies
Cryptocurrency projects
Foreign exchange companies
Foreign exchange market
Payment systems
Mobile payments
Micropayment
Software using the ISC license